Let's Eat 2 is a South Korean television series starring Yoon Doo-joon, Seo Hyun-jin and Kwon Yul. It aired on tvN from April 6 to June 2, 2015 for 18 episodes. This is the second season of 2013 Let's Eat series, with Yoon Doo-joon reprising his role as Goo Dae-young, who moves to Sejong City and befriends new neighbors and friends played by Seo Hyun-jin and Kwon Yul.

Synopsis
The series is about Goo Dae-young (Yoon Doo-joon), an insurance salesman, moving to the small town Sejong from the big city Seoul. He meets Baek Soo-ji (Seo Hyun-jin), who is his next door neighbour. They befriend each other quickly and make a contract while Soo-ji chases the love of her life, Lee Sang-woo (Kwon Yul).

Cast

Main
 Yoon Doo-joon as Goo Dae-young
 Seo Hyun-jin as Baek Soo-ji 
 Kwon Yul as Lee Sang-woo

Supporting
 Kim Hee-won as Lim Taek-soo, Dae-young's insurance colleague
 Hwang Seok-jeong as Kim Mi-ran, Dae-young and Soo-ji's landlady
 Jo Eun-ji as Hong In-ah, Soo-ji and Sang-woo's colleague
 Hwang Seung-eon as Hwang Hye-rim, a part-timer and beauty blogger
 Kim Ji-young as Lee Jum-yi, Dae-young and Soo-ji's first floor neighbor
 Lee Joo-seung as Lee Joo-seung / Ahn Chan-soo, Dae-young and Soo-ji's roof top neighbor
 Kim Dan-yool as Park Joo-wan, Mi-ran's son

Special appearances
 Bong Man-dae - himself (ep. 1)
 Jang Won-young - Choi Kyu-sik (ep. 1)
 Lee Do-yeon - Oh Do-yeon (ep. 1)
 Kevin Woo - Hye-rim's friend (ep. 5)
 Heo Ga-yoon - Hong Min-ah, In-ah's sister (ep. 7-9)
 Jo Jae-yoon - Mi-ran's husband (ep. 9)
 Gong Hyung-jin - In-ah's husband (ep. 11)
 Kim Hyun-suk - woman who bought treadmill from Soo-ji (ep. 11)
 Jung Ji-soon - laundry owner (ep. 14)
 Raymon Kim - restaurant owner (ep. 15)
 Tae In-ho - Lee Joo-seung (ep. 16)
 Yang Yo-seob - Dae-young's colleague (ep. 16)
 Lee Seung-joon - restaurant owner (ep. 17)
 Park Joon-hwa - potential tenant (ep. 18)
 Yoon So-yi - mysterious woman (ep. 18)

Ratings
In this table,  represent the lowest ratings and  represent the highest ratings.

Awards and nominations

References

External links
 Let's Eat 2 official tvN website 
 

TVN (South Korean TV channel) television dramas
2015 South Korean television series debuts
2015 South Korean television series endings
Television series by CJ E&M
South Korean romantic comedy television series
South Korean cooking television series
Sequel television series
Television shows set in Sejong City